Rillsoft Project is project management software, developed and sold by Rillsoft GmbH. That runs under the Windows operating systems.

Features

Project management 

Creating/presenting the project schedule from different angles, either by using a Gantt chart, a network diagram or a bar-network diagram. Calculation of critical path and contingency reserve highlights any bottlenecks the project may have.

Multi-project management 

Multi-project management allows to summarize multiple projects by theme, department or other criteria in portfolio, to edit parallel and to detect resource conflicts better. Cross-project links make different projects dependent on each other, but without automatic date adjustment by changes in foreign plans. Capacity planning is taking into account the resources already assigned to other projects.

Capacity planning 

Capacity planning provides a detailed overview of the coverage of personnel requirements with existing labour capacity taking into account the necessary skills, nonworking time and scheduling in other parallel running projects. It is important that a capacity alignment of actual employee assignment occurs.

Resource planning 
Comprising functions for personnel, machinery and materials management allow you to plan the use and utilization of your resources and enable to control them in the course of the project.

Personnel placement planning 

Personnel placement planning enables a flexible and demand-optimized assignment of personnel resources for the individual work steps. An employee utilization view ensures that all overloads and shortages can be detected in time.

Project controlling 

Project controlling is represented by feedback, execution status of tasks, financial control and variance analysis. In addition, email notification feature helps to keep the important due dates in mind.

Language support 

Rillsoft Project is available in English, German and Russian.

Editions 

Rillsoft Project is available in four editions, Freeware, Education, Light, Standard, Professional and Enterprise; all editions are available either as 32 or 64bit options:

The Professional and Enterprise edition can be connected to Rillsoft Integration Server.

History 

The first commercial version of Rillsoft Project was released in 2002.

Rillsoft Project 2007 was released in 2007

Rillsoft Project 5 was available in 2009

Rillsoft Project 6 was released in 2015

Screen Shots

See also
 List of project management software
Project management software
Project management
Project planning
Project Portfolio Management
Resource Management

References

External links 

Alles auf dem Schirm
Schlanker Projekthelfer
A New Multi-Project Server For a Proven Planning Tool

Project management software
Critical Path Scheduling
2016 software
Projects established in 2016